Chess with the Doomsday Machine (Shatranj ba Mashin-e Qiamat) is a novel about the Iran-Iraq war by Habib Ahmadzadeh. In 1980, an attack on the Iranian city of Abadan marked the beginning of the Iran-Iraq war. Hundreds of thousands of people fled the badly damaged city but a small number of civilians chose to stay, living in a city under siege. The story focuses on the experiences of Moosa, a young Abadani soldier defending his home town. He has been chosen to assist in destroying the enemy's "Doomsday Machine", a sophisticated radar system.

Publisher 
The book was written in 1996 and published in Persian by Soreie Mehr Publication Company in 2005. Chess with the Doomsday Machine has been nominated for and received numerous awards, and has been reprinted many times in Iran. According to critics, Chess with the Doomsday Machine is one of the most prominent novel about the Iran-Iraq war in recent years. In 2008, the book was translated from Persian into English by Paul Sprachman, a professor at Rutgers University, and published by Mazda Publishers.

The novel 

The "Doomsday Machine" of the title is the nickname given to a Cymbeline counter-battery radar system used by the Iraqi military to direct counter-battery fire against Iranian artillery. Moosa, the protagonist of the novel, becomes an artillery spotter in the duel between the two sides, using an unfinished multi-storey building as his observation post. A native Abadani, Moosa is also assigned to guard the few remaining civilians who choose to remain in the city during the Siege of Abadan.

Onelight Theatre adaptation
In 2012 Onelight Theatre decided to stage an adaptation of the Iranian novel. Onelight Theatre is a professional theatre company that has been developing and producing works in Halifax, Nova Scotia since 2002. Located at Alderney Landing, Onelight is the resident theatre company at the complex. After returning home from representing Canada at the Fadjr International Theatre Festival in Tehran, the show made its Canadian premiere on February 6, 2014. The production returned to Canada after first touring ran, with a debut in Abadan, the birthplace of the story and that of Onelight Theatre's artistic director, Shahin Sayadi. "Taking this work to stage in the place it all started, my hometown, has truly been an honour", said Sayadi. "I'm looking forward to bringing it home to Canada next month." Written and directed by Shahin Sayadi, Chess with the Doomsday Machine used a combination of English, Persian and nonverbal communication to tell the story of the challenges a young soldier must face.

The production was revived at Alderney Landing, for a run between January 19 to February 7, 2015.

Awards 
 Literary Award of Esfehan
 Year Book of Sacred Defense
 Year Book of Press Association of Writers and Critics
 Golden Pen Award of Iran
 Year Book of Islamic Republic of Iran

See also 
One Woman's War: Da (Mother)
Noureddin, Son of Iran
The Night Bus
That Which That Orphan Saw
Eternal Fragrance
Fortune Told in Blood
Journey to Heading 270 Degrees
I'm Alive
Baba Nazar

References

External links 
Onelight Theatre, project of Chess with the Doomsday Machine
Theatre Nova Scotial
Chess with the Doomsday Machine – Canadian debut presented by Onelight Theatre

1996 novels
Novels set during the Iran–Iraq War
Novels adapted into films
Persian-language novels
Abadan, Iran